CoRoT-6 is a magnitude 13.9 star located in the Ophiuchus constellation.

Location and properties
The star has a radius of about 102% of the Sun and a mass of about 110% of the Sun. It is a main sequence F type star a little larger and hotter than the Sun.

Planetary system
The star is orbited by one known extrasolar planet identified as CoRoT-6b. The discovery was made by the CoRoT program using the transit method.

References

F-type main-sequence stars
Planetary transit variables
Planetary systems with one confirmed planet
Ophiuchus (constellation)